Meydan Sar-e Keshteli (also Romanized as Meydān Sar-e Keshtelī; also known as Meydān Sar) is a village in Gatab-e Shomali Rural District, Gatab District, Babol County, Mazandaran Province, Iran. At the 2006 census, its population was 947, in 253 families.

References 

Populated places in Babol County